Menten is a surname. Notable people with the surname include:

Hubert Menten (1873–1964), Dutch bobsledder
Maud Menten (1879–1960), Canadian bio-medical and medical researcher
Milan Menten (born 1996), Belgian cyclist
Pieter Menten  (1899–1987), Dutch criminal, businessman  and art collector

See also 
Michaelis–Menten kinetics, is one of the best-known models of enzyme kinetics
Michaelis–Menten–Monod kinetics, it is intended the coupling of an enzyme-driven chemical reaction of the Michaelis-Menten type